Johann Zwelfer (1618–1668) was a German chemist, pharmacist and physician.

Works
 Herrn Johann Zwölfern Königliche Apotheck Oder Dispensatorium . Endter, Nürnberg 1692 Digital edition by the University and State Library Düsseldorf

1618 births
1668 deaths
17th-century German chemists
German pharmacists
17th-century German physicians
17th-century German writers
17th-century German male writers